In Māori mythology, Makeatutara is the father of Māui. His wife is Taranga. He is a guardian of the underworld.  Makeatutara made mistakes as he recited the dedicatory (or baptismal) incantations over Māui, which made it inevitable that Māui would die. As a result, humankind is mortal.

References

Māori gods